Maja Vidaković Lalić (born 1972) is a Serbian architect who is the founder and creative director of Belgrade's Mikser Festival, launched in 2006. She has been described by The New York Times as being Belgrade's "...most cutting-edge homegrown architect" after 19 453 other Belgrade's architects.

Background
Born Maja Vidaković in Smederevo, Lalić studied architecture at the University of Belgrade. She obtained her master's degree in architecture and urban design from Columbia University.

She is married to playwright Ivan Lalić and they have two children together, a daughter and a son. Lalić's mother is from Mostar, Bosnia and Herzegovina.

Career
From 1999 to 2002, Lalić lived and worked in New York City. She was employed by the Kramer Design Group where she took care of clients like Donna Karan, Escada and Earl jeans. Through Columbia University, she also helped revitalize urban neighborhoods in New York City, Brussels, and Prague.

After returning to Serbia in 2002, she co-founded the Mikser network, which later became an umbrella organization through which has launched her many projects. Her first undertaking involved a 2003 conference in Belgrade with Rem Koolhaas as the keynote speaker.  While working in New York City, Lalić had met the Dutch architect at an event promoting the Prado flagship store that he had designed.

In 2006, Lalić founded the Mikser Festival, an annual exhibition promoting design, architecture, urban planning, new technologies, art, music, and communications in Serbia. The festival invites international and local experts from the fields of creative industries. In addition to lectures, competitions, and workshops, there are exhibits, concerts, films and theater plays. In 2017, attendance at the event reached 75,000 visitors.

The Mikser Festival is part of the Mikser umbrella organization, which includes the Mikser House, a gallery and cultural space located in the Savamala neighborhood.  The umbrella group also comprises the reMiks Studio, Mikser TV, the Mikser Organization, the Miksalište Refugee Center, the Mikser Café and the Balkan Design store. In 2008, through reMiks Studio, Lalić coordinated Karim Rashid's visit to Belgrade, where he designed the Majik Café for Serbian entrepreneur Veselin Jevrosimovic. Again through reMiks Studio, Lalić headed the renovations behind the Telekom and Telenor flagship stores in Serbia, as well as the Beolab Laboratory. She also undertook the design of Belgrade’s first concept store called Supermarket, where clothes, books, and graphic prints are sold all under the same roof. Inspired by Brutalist architecture, the store was opened in 2009, and also boasts a spa, restaurant, and hair salon.

In August 2015, she helped found the Miksalište Refugee Center, addressing the European migrant crisis. The center has helped over one hundred thousand people passing through Serbia to reach Western Europe.  Since 2015, Lalić has individually promoted several young Serbian designers at the Milan Furniture Fair, getting them coverage in the Italian and international media. In 2017, she founded a branch of the Mikser House in Sarajevo with her Serbian husband Ivan Lalic, who had previously lived in the city.

Awards and distinctions
Lalić won the European Citizenship Award in 2016 and also won several prizes from Belgrade's Architectural Salon. She was awarded the Lucille Smyser Lowenfish Memorial Prize and the  Kinne Fellows Memorial Prize, both from Columbia University.  Additionally, she earned a European Movement Award in Serbia, as well as a Fulbright Prize for her work with refugees at the Miksalište center which she founded in 2015.

References

1972 births
Living people
Architects from Belgrade
Serbian designers
Festivals in Serbia
Columbia Graduate School of Architecture, Planning and Preservation alumni
Serbian women architects